Valery Korepanov is a Ukrainian scientist was born on 1 July 1943 in the (former) Soviet Union. Since 1996 he has been the Scientific Director of the Lviv Centre of Institute for Space Research of National Academy of Sciences of Ukraine and State Space Agency of Ukraine.

Biography
Graduated from Lviv Polytechnical Institute as electric engineer in 1965.

Ph.D. Degree in Electromagnetic Measurements in Lviv Polytechnical Institute in 1970.

Habilitation of Ph.D. in Geophysics in  Institute of  Physics of the Earth (Moscow) in 1991.

The first 30 years of his career he was active at the Institute of Physics and Mechanics (Lviv, Ukraine).

Publications 
Number of publications: 450 (Publications list (1997-2012))
 Korepanov V., Berkman R., New approach to the exact design of low noise search-coil magnetometers, XIV IMEKO World Congress, V. IVA, 1997, Topic 4, pp. 97–102.
 Korepanov V., Berkman R., Digital flux-gate magnetometer structural analysis, Meas. Sci. Technol., 10 (1999), pp. 734–737.
 F.Dudkin, V.Korepanov, G. Lizunov. Experiment VARIANT - first results from Wave Probe instrument. Advances in Space Research. Volume 43, Issue 12, 1904-1909 (2009).
 Sopruniuk P.M., Klimov S.I., Korepanov V.E., Electric fields in space plasma, Kiev, NAUKOVA DUMKA, 1994, 190 p. (in Russian).
 В.Е.Koрeпaнoв, А.Н.Свенсон. Высокоточные неполяризующиеся электроды для наземной геофизической разведки. К. Наукова думка. 2007. 96 с.   (in Russian).
 Korepanov V., Marusenkov А. Flux-Gate Magnetometers Design Peculiarities. Surveys in Geophysics. September 2012, Volume 33, Issue 5, pp 1059–1079

Awards, Honours 
 Badge of Merit by Aerospace association of Ukraine (2013);
 Christiaan Huygens Medal (2009);
 State Prize of Ukraine winner (2008);
 Order "For Merits" (2003);
 Honoured Diploma of Presidium of National Academy of Sciences of Ukraine (2001);
 Honoured Scientist of  Ukraine (1997);
 Honoured Diploma and medal of Presidium of Academy of Sciences of USSR (1973);
 Bronze medal of USSR Exposition of National Achievements (1985).

Membership of Professional Societies 
 International Academy of Astronautics (IAA) member
 Committee on Space Research (COSPAR) National board member
 International Association of Geomagnetism and Aeronomy (IAGA) WG 5-OBS on Geomagnetic Observatories member
 National Space Review and National Antarctic Bulletin editorial boards member
 European Geosciences Union (EGU) Geophysical Instrumentation Division member
 Electromagnetic Studies of Earthquakes and Volcanoes (EMSEV) bureau member

External links 

 EGU awards Christiaan Huygens Medal 2009 to Dr. Valery Korepanov
 Magnetometers for Geoscience (Christiaan Huygens Medal Lecture)
 Curriculum Vitae. Lviv Centre of Institute for Space Research

20th-century Ukrainian engineers
20th-century Ukrainian scientists
1943 births
Lviv Polytechnic alumni
Living people
People from Sochi
Laureates of the State Prize of Ukraine in Science and Technology